Federal Highway 37 (Fed. 37) is a free part of the federal highways corridors of Mexico. The highway runs from Villa de Zaragoza, San Luis Potosí at its northern point to Playa Azul, Michoacán, located near the Pacific Ocean, at its southern point, near the port city of Lázaro Cárdenas, Michoacán. It crosses Fed. 14 at Uruapan, Michoacán, and Mexican Federal Highway 200 at La Mira, Michoacan.

Fed. 37 runs in two separate improved segments: the first segment runs from Villa de Zaragoza to San Felipe, Guanajuato. The second segment runs from Manuel Doblado, Guanajuato to Playa Azul at Fed. 200. The two segments are connected via GTO 77 and Fed. 84-JAL 80. The highway is partly paralleled by Mexican Federal Highway 37D.

References

037